Joseph N. Bellino Jr. is an American politician from Michigan. Bellino is a Republican member of the Michigan Senate.

Early life 
On June 10, 1958, Bellino was born in Monroe, Michigan.

Education 
Bellino earned a degree from Monroe County Community College.

Career 
Bellino was a businessman as an owner of Broadway Market.

On November 8, 2016, Bellino won the election and became a Republican member of Michigan House of Representatives for District 17. Bellino defeated Bill LaVoy and Jeff Andring with 52.23% of the votes. On November 6, 2018, as an incumbent, Bellino won the election and continued serving District 17. Bellino defeated Michelle LaVoy.

On November 8, 2022, Bellino was elected to the Michigan Senate, where he represents the 16th district.

Bellino is a member of the Knights of Columbus and the National Rifle Association.

Personal life 
Bellino's wife is Peggy Bellino. They have three children. Bellino is Catholic.

References

External links 
 Joe Bellino at gophouse.org
 Joe Bellino at ballotpedia.org
 Joe Bellino at votesmart.org

Living people
1958 births
Republican Party members of the Michigan House of Representatives
Republican Party Michigan state senators
Catholics from Michigan
21st-century American politicians
People from Monroe, Michigan